The Directorate General of Shipping, India is an attached office under the Ministry of Shipping, Government of India, responsible for life, health, vessel and the environment for Indian registered ships and ships at Indian ports. The Directorate,  is located in Mumbai and led by Director General of Shipping  Dr Amitabh Kumar IRS and Additional Secretary to the Government of India.

Duties
The main job for the directorate is to ensure that Indian ships and shipping companies meet high safety- and environmental standards, to ensure that Indian seamen have high qualifications and good working- and living conditions, and to ensure that foreign ships in Indian territory and ports meet international rules.

The Director General of Shipping is vested with statutory powers under Section 7 of the Merchant Shipping Act, 1958, and is responsible for implementation of the provisions of the Act.

It ensures implementation of various international Conventions, relating to safely SOLAS, (International Convention for the Safety of Life at Sea) requirements for prevention of pollution, MARPOL 73/78 and other mandatory requirements of International Maritime Organization.

Directors

Shri Amitabh Kumar (IRS), Director General of Shipping.

See also

 Borders of India
 Climate of India
 Coastal India
 Exclusive economic zone of India
 Fishing in India
 Outline of India

References

External links
 Directorate General of Shipping

Maritime Directorate
Maritime safety organizations
Maritime transport authorities
Shipping in India
Ministry of Ports, Shipping and Waterways (India)